Morris Herbert Mugisha, commonly known as Morris Mugisha is a Ugandan actor, director, photographer,  model and reality television star commonly known for representing Uganda to the third season of Big Brother Africa in 2008 and his debut directorial feature film Stain which received twelve (the most nominations) at the Uganda Film Festival Awards, winning five and also won an award at the Africa Movie Academy Awards in 2021.

Career
Mugisha was a model and photographer before he represented Uganda in the third season of Big Brother Africa in 2008 where he finished in the sixth place during the eviction phase. He returned home and started a production company MOIDEAS where he is an art director, producer and copywriter. His first film production was a short film called "Fear Knows My Name" in 2019. In 2021, his directorial feature film "Stain" was nominated twelve times at the Uganda Film Festival Awards with the most nomination and won five awards including Best Feature Film. Mugisha also received a nomination for Best Director at the Africa Movie Academy Awards in Nigeria while the film received other six nominations and won an award for Best Actress in a Leading Role. Mugisha who had been doing acting in radio and television commercials landed his first onscreen acting role as Kevin in Mistakes Girls Do and then went on to play other roles in Kyaddala in 2019, Black Glove 2021 and Sanyu 2021.

Early life and education
He was born in Kigezi. He graduated from Makerere University with a degree in Arts (Literature communication and film), a diploma in performing Arts (Music Dance and Drama) as well as a Diploma in Radio and TV production.

Filmography

Awards and nominations

References

External links

 

1978 births
Living people
21st-century Ugandan male actors
Ugandan male television actors
Ugandan male models
Ugandan male film actors